Prevost (formally known as Prevost Car) is a Canadian manufacturer of touring coaches and bus shells for high-end motorhomes and specialty conversions. The company is a subsidiary of the Volvo Buses division of the Volvo Group.

History

Company 

The company was founded in 1924 by Eugène Prévost (1898–1965), a cabinet maker specializing in church pews and school furniture, who in 1924 was asked to build a custom bus body for a new REO truck chassis. Les Ateliers Prévost, as the company was then called, received several repeat orders. Between 1937 and 1939, Prevost Car's first bus manufacturing plant was built. Initially the vehicles were built around a wooden frame. In 1945 this changed, and bodies were made of metal.

The company was acquired by Paul Normand in 1957.  In 1969, two American businessmen formed a partnership with André Normand, then President of Prevost, to become the company's owners. These three men, in turn, sold Prevost to Volvo Bus Corporation in 1995.

As of February 2007, the firm has 1,337 employees.

As of June 2019, Prevost operates 15 parts and service centers in North America, nine of them in the United States.

Models 

For 2006, the XLII was revised to become the X3-45. The H3-45 received a new sound system, plus GPS and destination sign options.

Starting in 2007, Prevost buses have a diesel particulate filter, to meet the 2007 EPA emissions standards. 2007 models also have a 14 liter Detroit Diesel Series 60 engine, up from 12.7 liters on previous models.

For the 2008 model year, Prevost introduced the Volvo D13 engine from their parent company as a replacement for the then-current Detroit Diesel Series 60 offering. The Volvo I-Shift semi-automatic transmission was introduced as an alternative to the Allison B500R transmission. A set of new interior color schemes was also introduced.

Since 2009, Prevost has distributed the Volvo 9700 bus in North America.

Beginning in 2011, the Prevost X3-45 is available in a transit configuration, with bi-fold doors instead of a sedan-type door. The New York City Transit Authority was the launch customer for this configuration. Previously, 20 transit-style buses in the LeMirage predecessor model had been built for GO Transit in the late 1990s.

In 2019, the X3-45 was redesigned, getting a new headlight setup and a new rear end. It continues to be available in intercity and transit configurations.

For the 2024 Model Year, the H3-45 was redesigned with a new front end and interior facelift.

Current products

Former products 
 H5-60 articulated 79 passenger motorcoach manufactured from 1985 to late 1980s
 H3-40 passenger coach first manufactured 1989
 XLII (now known as the X3-45) sightseeing/passenger coach manufactured from 2000 to 2005
X3-45 first generation - produced from 2006 to 2019 then redesigned in 2019 for its second generation
 XL40 Le Mirage XL sightseeing/passenger coach
 50-PI-33 passenger coach
 19-S transit bus manufactured from 1961 to 1967
 33-S 33 to 37 passenger motorcoach manufactured in the 1960s
 Champion 41 to 50 passenger intercity coach manufactured from 1967 to 1981
 Marathon 47 to 53 passenger intercity motorcoach
 Prestige 41 to 50 passenger sightseeing/passenger motor coach manufactured from 1968 to 1981
 Panoramique 41 to 49 passenger intercity motorcoach manufactured from the 1960s
 Le Normand intercity passenger coach manufactured from 1957 to 1960
 Prévocar intercity motorcoach manufactured in 1953
 Skycruiser motorcoach manufactured from 1948 to 1949
 V48-S motorcoach first manufactured in 1965
 Citadin 33 to 37 transit bus manufactured in the 1950s
 1924 motorbus
 1939 suburban motor coach

Ground Force One 

Ground Force One is the nickname given to two heavily modified X3-45 VIP conversion coach owned by the United States Secret Service and used by the President of the United States and other high-ranking politicians or dignitaries. Prevost built the coach as a conversion shell, the Hemphill Brothers Coach Company fitted out the interiors of the coach, and it is assumed that other features, like armor plating, were added by the Secret Service.

Notes

External links 

 
 Barraclou.com – Miscellaneous Prevost coaches
 busexplorer.com Prevost page

Bus manufacturers of Canada
Motor vehicle assembly plants in Canada
Motor vehicle manufacturers based in Quebec
Volvo buses
Manufacturing companies established in 1924
Manufacturing companies based in Quebec